"Call Me" is a 1985 song by the British band Go West, which reached no. 12 in the UK Charts and no. 54 in the US.

History
On 7" vinyl, the album version of the song appeared, along with the B-side "Man in My Mirror", which later appeared on the remix album Bangs & Crashes. The 12" vinyl included the extended mix (labelled "The Indiscriminate Mix") along with either the album version of "Call Me" and "Man in My Mirror" on the second side in Europe, or "We Close Our Eyes (Complete Underhang Mix)" in North America. A German 12" included "The Indiscriminate Mix" on the first side, and the album version and "The Indiscriminate -Kitchen Sink- Mix" on the second side. The "-Kitchen Sink- Mix" is identical to the "Indiscriminate Mix", but equalized differently and lightly reverberated to sound as if the record was playing inside of an actual kitchen sink. This second remix was released as its own 12" single in the United Kingdom, with "Eye To Eye (The Horizontal Mix)" and "Man in My Mirror" on its second side.

In popular culture
The song is included on the soundtrack for the popular 2002 video game Grand Theft Auto: Vice City, on the fictional in-game radio station "Flash FM" and on the official soundtrack release.

Charts

Weekly charts

Year-end charts

References

1985 singles
1985 songs
Chrysalis Records singles
Go West (band) songs
Music videos directed by Russell Mulcahy
Songs written by Peter Cox (musician)
Songs written by Richard Drummie